Anthem is an album by Steve Lacy released on the Arista Novus label in 1990. It features five of Lacy's compositions (and one by Jean-Jacques Avenel) with texts by Osip Mandelstam and Mary Frazee performed by Lacy, Bobby Few, Steve Potts, Jean-Jacques Avenel, John Betsh, Sam Kelly, Glenn Ferris, La Velle and Irene Aebi.

Reception
The Allmusic review by Stephen Cook awarded the album 4.5 stars stating "With more composition and performance highlights than most jazz albums ever muster, Anthem is essential listening for Lacy fans and all other adventurous listeners out there.".

Track listing
 "Number One" - 9:01
 "Prayer" - 9:21
 "J. J.'s Jam" (Avenel) - 6:53
 "Prelude And Anthem" (text by Osip Mandelstam) - 15:48
 "The Mantle" (text by Mary Frazee) - 9:22
 "The Rent" - 7:17

All compositions by Steve Lacy except as indicated
Recorded June 27–28, 1989 at Family Sound Studios, Paris

Personnel
Steve Lacy - soprano saxophone
Bobby Few - piano
Steve Potts - alto and soprano saxophones
Jean-Jacques Avenel - bass
John Betsch - drums
La Velle - vocals
Irene Aebi - vocals
Sam Kelly - percussion
Glenn Ferris - trombone

References 

1990 albums
Steve Lacy (saxophonist) albums
Novus Records albums